The 1978 NC State Wolfpack football team represented North Carolina State University during the 1978 NCAA Division I-A football season. The team's head coach was Bo Rein. NC State has been a member of the Atlantic Coast Conference (ACC) since the league's inception in 1953. The Wolfpack played its home games in 1978 at Carter Stadium (now Carter–Finley Stadium) in Raleigh, North Carolina, which has been NC State football's home stadium since 1966.

Schedule

Roster

References

NC State Wolfpack
NC State Wolfpack football seasons
Citrus Bowl champion seasons
NC State Wolfpack football